Madhuchhandha, also known as Madhushchandhas Vaishvamitra, is a sage mentioned in Hindu literature. A number of hymns in Rigveda are composed by him. He is one of the sons of the sage Vishvamitra. Madhuchanda is regarded to have had a mastery over Vedic literature and was also a great singer.

Literature

Rigveda 
Madhuchhanda was the maker of the hymn to the god of fire, Agni, with which the Rigveda begins. He is attributed as the author of the first ten hymns in the Mandala 1 of Rigveda.

References

Characters in Hindu mythology
Sages in the Ramayana
Hindu sages